Central Asians in the United Kingdom are Central Asians living in the United Kingdom. They have been present in the country since the 21st century and primarily originate from the countries Kazakhstan, Kyrgyzstan, Tajikistan, Turkmenistan, and Uzbekistan.

Population history
The UK Government considers the Central Asian sovereign states to be Kazakhstan, Kyrgyzstan, Tajikistan, Turkmenistan and Uzbekistan. According to United Nations population estimates conducted in 2015, there are over 10,000 Central Asian people residing in the United Kingdom. In 2001, Nooralhaq Nasimi founded the Afghanistan and Central Asian Association (ACAA) in London, which seeks to specifically help Afghan, as well as Central Asian refugees settle in the UK.

Subgroups

Kazakhs

The UN has estimated that there are 5,432 Kazakhs living in the United Kingdom, as of 2015. In 2009, it was reported that Kazakh entrepreneurs were achieving high positions in British industry. Kazakh politician Dariga Nazarbayeva is a part-time resident in London. In 2011, Kazakh businessman Mukhtar Ablyazov was granted asylum in the UK, along with his wife and children. In 2018, a Kazakh TV-feature reported how ethnic Kazakhs in the UK preserved their culture and language while living as part of the diaspora.

Kazakhs have studied at British schools and universities since at least 2006. In the 2006/2007 school year, private school Haileybury and Imperial Service College had 14 Kazakh students. In 2020, it was reported that the UK was the most popular destination of Kazakhstan's Bolashak Programme, allowing the majority of its students to reside and study in Britain.

Kyrgyz

Between 1997 and 2002, Kyrgyz diplomat Roza Otunbayeva resided in London, England, serving as the Central Asian nation's ambassador to the UK. In 2007, the Israeli Government helped support an appeal against the deportation of Kyrgyz nationals from the United Kingdom. The refugees, who were orphaned twin sisters and resided in Birmingham, England, were claiming asylum in the country. Kyrgyz former politician Maxim Bakiyev is a resident in the United Kingdom. In 2015, the UN estimated there were 1,132 Kyrgyz residents in the UK.

Tajiks

In 2013, Tajik child care workers gained temporary residency in the UK, travelling to Falkirk, Scotland for professional training in their field. The sharing of modern child care techniques was administered by Falkirk Council and funded by an EU-backed scheme. By 2015, the UN had estimated a total population of 455 Tajiks in the country.

Turkmens

In 2015, the UN estimated that there were 784 Turkmens residing in the United Kingdom.

Uzbeks

The second largest national subgroup of Central Asians after Kazakhs, the United Nations estimated a total population of 2,864 Uzbeks living in the United Kingdom in 2015.

See also
 British Turks
 British Asian
 East Asians in the United Kingdom
 Southeast Asians in the United Kingdom

References

External links

Asian diaspora in the United Kingdom
Central Asian diaspora